Upāsaka (masculine) or Upāsikā (feminine) are from the Sanskrit and Pāli words for "attendant". This is the title of followers of Buddhism (or, historically, of Gautama Buddha) who are not monks, nuns, or novice monastics in a Buddhist order, and who undertake certain vows. In modern times they have a connotation of dedicated piety that is best suggested by terms such as "lay devotee" or "devout lay follower".

Precepts
The five vows to be held by upāsakas are referred to as the "Five Precepts" (Pāli: pañcasīla):
 I will not take the life of a sentient being;
 I will not take what has not been given to me;
 I will refrain from sexual misconduct;
 I will refrain from false speech;
 I will refrain from becoming intoxicated.

In the Theravada tradition, on Uposatha days, devout lay practitioners may request the "Eight Precepts" from monastics (Pali: uposathaṃ samādiyati). It was a widespread practice in Chinese Buddhist communities as well, and is still practiced.

The eight precepts is a list of precepts that are observed by lay devotees on observance days and festivals. They include general precepts such as refraining from killing, but also more specific ones, such as abstaining from cosmetics. These precepts were probably based on pre-Buddhist  sāmaṇa practices. Since the eight precepts are often upheld on the Buddhist uposatha days, they are called the uposatha vows or one-day precepts in such context. They are considered to support meditation practice, and are often observed when staying in monasteries and temples. In some periods and places, such as in 7th10th-century China, the precepts were widely observed. In modern times, there have been revival movements and important political figures that have observed them continuously.

Initiation ceremonies

Theravada traditions

In traditional Theravada communities, a non-Buddhist becomes a Buddhist lay disciple by repeating the ancient formulas for the Three Refuges and the Five Precepts in response to the formal administrations of a monk or by himself in himself or in front of a Cetiya or an image of the Buddha. Newborns of Buddhist parents are traditionally initiated by being brought on their first outing to a temple on a full-moon or festival day where they are presented to the Triple Gem.

Mahayana/Vajrayana traditions
In both the Chinese Ch'an and Japanese Zen traditions, a ceremony of taking refuge in the Triple Gem as well as the receiving of the precepts (受戒 ) is a type of lay ordination.

The ordination procedures for receiving precepts in the Chinese tradition are laid out in the fourteenth chapter of the Sutra on Upasaka Precepts (優婆塞戒經受戒品第十四).

The disciple hoping to receive the precepts first pays respects to the six directions, which represent their parents, teacher, husband or wife, friends, religious master and employees (traditionally servants). Honoring the six directions is a "means fulfilling one's reciprocal responsibilities in each of these relationships".

A person who has honored these relationships and paid his respects to the six directions must then receive permission from his parents to accept the precepts. If they agree, he informs his spouse and those under his employment. The disciple should then get permission from his king, though for obvious reasons this last procedure is no longer widely observed.

The disciple, having paid his respects to the six directions and having the relevant permissions, may now ask a monastic to help him receive the precepts. (In modern times, these ceremonies are normally held on a regular basis at temples and presided over by the temple master or his deputy, and one would not ask a random monk or nun to perform the ceremony.)

The monastic and disciple then engage in a dialog, with the monastic asking questions and the disciple answering. The monastic asks the disciple if he has paid respects to the six directions and if he has the relevant permissions. The monk will ask a series of questions that ensure the practitioner has not committed grave offenses and is both physically and mentally fit to receive the precepts.

The monastic explains the benefits of the precepts as well as the negative consequences of breaking them, and asks if the disciple is prepared to accept them and remain dedicated to the Triple Gem. Next, the monastic asks the disciple if to follow additional habits to prevent breaking the precepts, to discourage others from breaking them, and to avoid excessive attachment to the five skandhas. If the practitioner is prepared, the monk asks the disciple to practice all the advice for six months while remaining under the monk's regular observation.

If, after six months, the disciple has upheld the precepts well, he may ask the monastic for formal taking of the precepts. The disciple will then take refuge in the Triple Gem, and the monastic will then ensure the disciple is prepared to take on all (as opposed to only some) of the precepts. If the disciple commits to accepting all the precepts, and recites them with the monk, then he has finished his lay ordination.

The chapter closes with a description of consequences of breaking the precepts and the obligations that one must take on after receiving the precepts.

Ceremonial dress
Traditionally, in India, upāsakas wore white robes, representing a level of renunciation between lay people and monastics.  For this reason, some traditional texts make reference to "white-robed lay people" (avadāta-vassana).  This practice can still be found in contemporary Theravadin temples, especially during the occasion when a non-Buddhist converts to Buddhism or when one is observing the Eight Precepts on an uposatha day.

In the Chinese tradition, both upāsakas and upāsikās are permitted to wear robes for temple ceremonies and retreats, as well as home practice. Upāsakas and upāsikās wear long sleeved black robes called haiqing (海青), symbolic of their refuge in the Triple Jewel. A brown kasaya called a manyi (缦衣) worn outside the black robes is symbolic of their upholding of the precepts. Unlike monastics, they are not permitted to regularly wear robes outside functions other than temple activities or Buddhist disciplines.

Some Japanese laity can also be seen wearing a rakusu, a short cloth worn around the neck of Zen Buddhist laity. Another form is the wagesa, a short surplice in the form of a strip of brocade fabric worn around the neck, with the temple mon emblazoned on it. It also acts as a simplified type of kasaya.

Famous lay followers

In the Early Buddhist Texts (SN 17:23), the Buddha said that a devoted lay disciple should foster the wish to become like Citta and Hatthaka, while devoted bhikkhus should aspire to equal Sāriputta and Mahāmoggallāna. They are the model standards are set for lay people and monks. Of the ten instructive discourses contained in the Citta Saṃyutta, three of the discourses deal with the questions posed by Citta to the bhikkhus, three of them are queries put to Citta by the bhikkhus, and four refer to personal events.

In the Vajrayana tradition, a well known Upasaka is Upasaka Dharmatala who serves as the attendant of the 16 arhats.  He is seen to be an emanation of Avalokitesvara.

From the Buddhist scriptures
In the Pali Canon's Jivaka Sutta, the Buddha is asked, "Lord, to what extent is one a lay follower (upāsako)?"  The Buddha replies that one takes refuge in the Triple Gem.  Asked how one is a "virtuous lay follower" (upāsako sīlavā), the Buddha replies that one undertakes the Five Precepts. Asked how one practices being a lay follower "both for his own benefit & the benefit of others," the Buddha states that one is consummate oneself in and encourages others in the consummation of: conviction (saddhā); virtue (sīla); generosity (cāga); visiting monks; and, hearing, remembering, analyzing, understanding and practicing the Dhamma.

See also
Three Refuges 
Five Precepts
Eight Precepts
Dhammika Sutta (Sn 2.14)
Dighajanu Sutta (AN 8.54)
Sigalovada Sutta (DN 31)
Householder (Buddhism)
Sravaka - Buddhist "disciple" (includes both monastic and lay followers)
Anagarika- a title which describes a midway status between a monk and a layperson
Ngagpa - non-monastic Tibetan Buddhism practitioners

Notes

Bibliography
 Bluck, Robert (2002). The Path of the Householder: Buddhist Lay Discipline in the Pali Canon, Buddhist Studies Review 19 (1), 1-18
 
 Encyclopædia Britannica (2007). "Upasaka." Retrieved 2007-10-24 from "Encyclopædia Britannica Online" at https://web.archive.org/web/20060621163706/http://www.britannica.com/eb/article-9074383.
 
 Harvey, Peter (1990). An introduction to Buddhism: Teachings, history and practices (1st ed.), Cambridge University Press. .
 
 
 Kariyawasam, A.G.S. (1995). Buddhist Ceremonies and Rituals of Sri Lanka (The Wheel Publication No. 402/404). Kandy, Sri Lanka: Buddhist Publication Society. Retrieved 2007-10-22 from "Access to Insight" (1996 transcription) at http://www.accesstoinsight.org/lib/authors/kariyawasam/wheel402.html.
 
 
 Mendis, N.K.G. (2001). The Questions of King Milinda: An Abridgement of the Milindapañha. Kandy: Buddhist Publication Society. 
 Nattier, Jan (2003). A Few Good Men: The Bodhisattva Path according to The Inquiry of Ugra. Honolulu: University of Hawai'i Press. .

 Rhys Davids, T.W. & William Stede (eds.) (1921-5). The Pali Text Society’s Pali–English dictionary. Chipstead: Pali Text Society.  A general on-line search engine for the PED is available at http://dsal.uchicago.edu/dictionaries/pali/. Retrieved on 2006-12-26.

External links
Theravada resources for Upasakas
 Sri Lanka Buddha Jayanti Tipitaka Series [SLTP] (undated). Gahapativaggo [in Pali] (AN 8).  Available on-line at http://metta.lk/tipitaka/2Sutta-Pitaka/4Anguttara-Nikaya/Anguttara5/8-atthakanipata/003-gahapativaggo-p.html. Retrieved on 2007-04-28.
 Thanissaro Bhikkhu (trans.) (1997). Jivaka Sutta: To Jivaka (On Being a Lay Follower) (AN 8.26). Available on-line at http://www.accesstoinsight.org/tipitaka/an/an08/an08.026.than.html. Retrieved on 2007-04-28.

Buddhist monasticism
Buddhist titles
Buddhist oaths